Alaska's Division of Homeland Security & Emergency Management (Alaska DHS) was created in early 2004 from the merger of the Alaska Division of Homeland Security which was created in March 2003 under the Alaska Disaster Act and the Emergency Services within the Department of Military and Veterans Affairs which was created in 1977. The purpose of the Alaska's Division of Homeland Security and Emergency Management is to protect Alaskans and their property from terrorism and all other hazards, as well as to provide rapid recovery from all disasters.

From its list of duties assigned in the Alaska Disaster Act, DHS&EM is the foremost agency within the executive branch of the state government of Alaska for assisting the governor of Alaska to fulfill the statutory responsibility of "meeting the dangers presented by disasters to the State and its people."

References

External links 

 
 Alaska Disaster Act (Alaska Statute 26.23.)
 Overview of the Alaska Disaster Act

Government agencies established in 2004
State departments of homeland security of the United States
Homeland
Emergency management in the United States
2004 establishments in Alaska